Shariati (pertaining to Sharia) may refer to:

People

 Ali Shariati, Iranian revolutionary and sociologist
 Azita Shariati, Iranian-born Swedish business executive
 Effat Shariati, former Member of the Parliament of Iran
 Ali Shariati, Iranian activist and political prisoner

Places

 Bagh-e Shariati, village in Javaran Rural District, Kerman Province, Iran
 Shariati Metro Station
 Shariati-ye Yek, village in Kut-e Abdollah Rural District, Khuzestan Province, Iran